Charles Peter O'Sullivan (July 31, 1915 – September 20, 2013) was a World War II veteran fighter pilot and squadron commander of the 39th Fighter Squadron, Army Air Forces while in New Guinea. He flew the Lockheed P-38 Lightning and was shot down on September 20, 1943 south of Wewak while escorting bombers. He evaded enemy capture in the jungles with just a pistol and a knife and finally rejoined his squadron on October 20, 1943 after 30 days missing in action.

Early life and education
O'Sullivan was born July 31, 1915 in Eureka, Illinois. He graduated from Northwestern University with a degree in business administration.

Military career
He joined the United States Army on February 12, 1941 as an aviation cadet. He was commissioned as a 2nd Lieutenant in the Army Air Forces on September 21, 1941 at Brooks Field and was subsequently transferred to Mitchel Air Force Base, New York. During World War II, He flew 178 combat missions with 400 combat hours, shot down five enemy aircraft and became a flying ace.

He became the first commander of the 308th Strategic Missile Wing of the Strategic Air Command at Little Rock Air Force Base, Arkansas, which had oversight of 18 LGM-25C Titan II intercontinental ballistic missile launch sites. His unit was on heightened alert during the Cuban Missile Crisis.

He received the Silver Star, Legion of Merit and Distinguished Flying Cross. In 1968, he retired as a colonel. In 1998, he was inducted into the Arkansas Aviation Hall of Fame.

See also
List of solved missing person cases

References

1915 births
1940s missing person cases
2013 deaths
American World War II flying aces
Aviation hall of fame inductees
Formerly missing people
Military personnel from Illinois
Missing in action of World War II
Missing person cases in Asia
Northwestern University alumni
People from Eureka, Illinois
Recipients of the Distinguished Flying Cross (United States)
Recipients of the Legion of Merit
Recipients of the Silver Star
Shot-down aviators
United States Air Force colonels
United States Army Air Forces pilots of World War II